Whi2 or Whiskey 2 is a 55 kDa globular, cytoplasmatic scaffold protein in Saccharomyces cerevisiae, which plays an essential role in stress response pathways, apparently by passing input signals about nutrient availability on to stress responsive elements and autophagy/mitophagy mechanisms. It is encoded by a 1.46 kbp gene located on chromosome 15.

Functional mechanism 
Upon complexing with plasma membrane associated phosphatase Psr1, Whi2 induces general stress response by dephosphorylating general stress response transcription factor Msn2. Whi2 is essential for Msn2 activity, moreover activation by Whi2 is dominant and independent of the PKA and TOR activation pathways. Additionally, experiments are suggesting Whi2 for playing a role in Ras2 deactivation or degradation during nutrient depletion.

References 

Proteins